Île aux Juifs, Paris (literally Island of the Jews or Jewish Island), also called Île des Templiers, was a small island on the Seine in Paris situated just west of the Île de la Cité. The island was named for the number of executions of Jews that took place on it during the Middle Ages. It was on this island that Jacques de Molay, the last Grand Master of the Knights Templar, and another Templar leader, Geoffroi de Charney, were burnt to death for heresy on 18 March 1314. The island, along with two other small islands next to it, were joined to the Île de la Cité when the Pont Neuf was built across it between 1578 and 1604.

History 
The island was located just to the west of tip of the Île de la Cité, approximately where the Square du Vert-Galant and is today. It was overlooked by the tower of the old royal palace at the end of the Île de la Cité and was opposite the Tour de Nesle, a smaller royal castle on the left bank of the Seine. The island alongside it, of similar size, was called the Île de la Gourdaine, and was the location of a mill."Dictionnaire historique de Paris", "Îles", p. 360   A third, very small island, made of gravel, was at the very point, and was called the Motte aux Papelards, or Terrain.  The addition of the three small islands at the end, plus the constructions of quays alongside, increased the size of the Île de la Cité from about eight hectares (20 acres) in Roman times to seventeen hectares (42 acres) today. In the Middle Ages the island was the property of the Abbey of Saint-Germain-des-Pres."Dictionnaire historique de Paris", "Îles", p. 360

Name   
The island was also known at various times as the Île aux Treilles, Ile de Justice, Île de Galilee, and Ile aux Bureaux, and as the Île des Templiers.

References

Bibliography 

 

Former islands of France
1st arrondissement of Paris
Landforms of Paris
Île-de-France region articles needing translation from French Wikipedia